Italian settlers in Libya (also called Italian Libyans) typically refers to Italians and their descendants, who resided or were born in Libya during the Italian colonial period.

History
Italian heritage in Libya can be dated back to Ancient Rome, when the Romans controlled and colonized Libya for a period of more than five centuries prior to the fall of the Roman Empire and its takeover by Arab and Turkish civilizations. But predominantly Italian heritage in Libya refers to modern-day Italians.

In 1911, the Kingdom of Italy waged war on the Ottoman Empire and captured Libya as a colony. Italian settlers were encouraged to come to Libya and did so from 1911 until the outbreak of World War II.

Developments

In less than thirty years (1911–1940), the Italians in Libya built a significant amount of public works (roads, railways, buildings, ports, etc.) and the Libyan economy flourished. They even created the Tripoli Grand Prix, an international motor racing event first held in 1925 on a racing circuit outside Tripoli (it lasted until 1940).

Italian farmers cultivated lands that had returned to native desert for many centuries, and improved Italian Libya's agriculture to international standards (even with the creation of new farm villages).

Catholicism experienced a huge growth in those years, with many new churches built for the growing Italian community: in the late 1920s the two catholic Cathedrals of Tripoli and Benghazi were built. The one in Benghazi was considered the biggest in north Africa.

The governor Italo Balbo is attributed with the creation of modern Libya in 1934, when he convinced Italian leader Benito Mussolini to unite the Italian colonies of Tripolitania, Cyrenaica and the Fezzan into one single country named "Libia" in Italian.

Emigrants

Libya was considered the new "America" for the Italian emigrants in the 1930s, substituting the United States.

The Italians in Libya numbered 108,419 (12.37% of the total population) at the time of the 1939 census. They were concentrated in the coast around the city of Tripoli (they constituted 37% of the city's population) and Benghazi (31%).

In 1938, Governor Balbo brought 20,000 Italian farmers to colonize Libya, and 26 new villages were founded for them, mainly in Cyrenaica.

On 9 January 1939, the colony of Libya was incorporated into metropolitan Italy and thereafter considered an integral part of the Italian state. Libya, as the Fourth Shore, was to be part of the Imperial Italy, desired by the Italian irredentists.

By 1939 the Libyan Italians had built 400 km of new railroads and 4,000 km of new roads (the largest and most important was the one from Tripoli to Tobruk, on the coast) in Libya.

World War II

In 1940 World War II broke out between Italy and Great Britain. The defeat of the Axis forces in the North African Campaigns of World War II meant Italy lost Libya to British and French control. After these Western Desert Campaign defeats in 1943, Italy was forced to abandon its colonial intentions and projects, but most of the Italian settlers remained in Libya.

After World War II

From 1947 to 1951, Tripolitania and Cyrenaica were under British administration, while the French controlled Fezzan. Under the terms of the 1947 peace treaty with the Allies, Italy relinquished all claims to Libya. On 21 November 1949, the UN General Assembly passed a resolution stating that Libya should become independent before 1 January 1952. On 24 December 1951, Libya declared its independence as the United Kingdom of Libya, a constitutional and hereditary monarchy. 

The Italian population virtually disappeared after the Libyan leader Muammar Gaddafi ordered the expulsion of remaining Italians (about 20,000) in 1970. After the nationalization of Italian companies, only a small number of Italians remained in Libya. In 1986, after the political crisis between the United States and Libya, the number of Italians decreased even further, reaching an all-time low of 1,500 people, that is, less than 0.1% of the population. In the 1990s and 2000s, with the end of the economic embargo, some Colonial-era Italians (a few dozen pensioners) returned to Libya. In 2004 there were 22,530 Italians in Libya, almost the same number as in 1962, mainly skilled workers in the oil industries (principally in Eni, which has been present in Libya since 1953) arrived at the end of the nineties. Only a few hundred of them were allowed to return to Libya in the 2000s.

On 30 August 2008, Gaddafi and Italian Prime Minister Silvio Berlusconi signed a historic cooperation treaty in Benghazi. Under its terms, Italy would pay $5 billion to Libya as compensation for its former military occupation. In exchange, Libya would take measures to combat illegal immigration coming from its shores and boost investments in Italian companies. The treaty was ratified by Italy on 6 February 2009, and by Libya on 2 March, during a visit to Tripoli by Berlusconi. Co-operation ended in February 2011 as a result of the Libyan Civil War which overthrew Gaddafi. At the signing ceremony of the document, Italian Prime Minister Silvio Berlusconi recognized historic atrocities and repression committed by the state of Italy against the Libyan people during colonial rule, stating: In this historic document, Italy apologizes for its killing, destruction and repression of the Libyan people during the period of colonial rule." and went on to say that this was a "complete and moral acknowledgement of the damage inflicted on Libya by Italy during the colonial era".

21st century
Only a few hundred Italians were allowed to return to Libya between 2000 and 2010. In 2006 the Italian embassy in Tripoli calculated that there were approximately 1,000 original Libyan Italians in Libya, mostly elderly people and assimilated Muslims living in Tripoli and Benghazi.

On 16 February 2006, the Italian consulate in Benghazi was closed following protests after Minister Roberto Calderoli appeared on television wearing a T-shirt depicting one of the caricatures of Muhammad. The protests resulted in the deaths of 11 Libyans and the wounding of 60 others, as well as damage to the Italian consulate.

According to official figures, in 2007 there were 598 Italians in Libya. Almost all the Italians in Libya were evacuated at the start of the first Civil War in 2011, on special flights and by ship. A few Italians returned to Libya after 2012, mainly oil technicians, humanitarian workers and diplomats, but most of these left at the start of the second Civil War in 2014.

There are also many descendants (probably 10,000, according to estimates of Italian historian Vidali) of Italian settlers who married Arabs and/or Berbers, and Libyans of mixed Italian and Arab/Berber blood may be considered Arabs or Berbers in the Libyan census.

At present, the Libyan Italians are organized in the Associazione Italiani Rimpatriati dalla Libia. They are involved in a struggle to have their confiscated properties returned.

Population chart

Notable people

Well-known Italian Libyans born in Libya (according to their place of birth)

Tripoli

 Claudio Gentile (born 1953), international football player and coach
 Rossana Podestà (1934-2013), international actress
 Franco Califano (1938-2013), singer and music composer
 Don Coscarelli (born 1954), movie director and writer
 Herbert Pagani (1944–1988), singer
 Adriano Visconti (1915–1945), fighter pilot and flying ace
 Nicolò D'Alessandro (born 1944), artist and writer
 Emanuele Caracciolo (1912–1944), movie producer
 Robert Haggiag (1913–2009), film producer
 Nicola Conte (1920–1976), navy officer
 Victor Magiar (born 1957), writer
 Valentino Parlato (born 1930), journalist and newspaper editor
 Gianni Pilo (born 1939), writer
 Ottavio Macaione (Born 1925–2016), favorite local football player in Tripoli.
 Valeria Rossi (born 1969), singer

Benghazi
 Maurizio Seymandi (born 1939), TV anchor
  (1924–1984), Italian Army General

Tarhuna
 Giovanni Innocenzo Martinelli (1942–2019), Libyan-Italian Roman Catholic prelate

Al Khums
 Mario Schifano (1934–1998), painter

Marj
 Lorenzo Bandini (1935–1967), motor racing driver

See also

 Libyan resistance movement
 Italian Colonial Empire
 Italo-Turkish War
 Italian Libya
 Italian refugees from Libya
 Mare Nostrum
 Italy–Libya relations
 Pied-Noirs

References

Bibliography

 Sarti, Roland. The Ax Within: Italian Fascism in Action. Modern Viewpoints. New York, 1974.
 Smeaton Munro, Ion. Through Fascism to World Power: A History of the Revolution in Italy. Ayer Publishing. Manchester (New Hampshire), 1971. 
 Taylor, Blaine. Fascist Eagle: Italy's Air Marshal Italo Balbo. Montana: Pictorial Histories Publishing Company, 1996.

External links
 Photos of former Italian settlers and their villages in Libya
 The Italians in Libya after World War II 
 Italian Libyan citizenship problems
Agreement to restore Italian Cemetery in Tripoli
 Photos of Italian Tripoli

Italian Libya
Ethnic groups in Libya
 
 
Italian02
Libya
Italy–Libya relations
Libya